Merrington may refer to
 Merrington, Shropshire, a village in England
Kirk Merrington, a village in County Durham, England
Merrington (surname)